Raúl Manuel Pacheco Mendoza (born 26 April 1979) is a Peruvian long-distance runner. He was born in Santa Fe de Jauja. He competed at the 2012 Summer Olympics in the men's marathon, finishing in 21st place. Raul Pacheco placed 6th at the Rotterdam Marathon (2:11:01) in 2015, set a new national record and qualified for the Rio 2016 Summer Olympics. In July 2015, he placed  second in the Toronto Pan American Games with a time of 2:17:13, and took home Peru's inaugural medal in a marathon at the Pan American games.

References

 
 Profile at Sports-Reference.com

1979 births
Living people
Peruvian male long-distance runners
Peruvian male marathon runners
Olympic male marathon runners
Olympic athletes of Peru
Athletes (track and field) at the 2012 Summer Olympics
Pan American Games silver medalists for Peru
Pan American Games medalists in athletics (track and field)
Athletes (track and field) at the 2015 Pan American Games
Medalists at the 2015 Pan American Games